The dollar was the currency of New Brunswick between 1860 and 1867. It replaced the pound at a rate of 4 dollars = 1 pound (5 shillings = 1 dollar) and was equal to the Canadian dollar. The New Brunswick dollar was replaced by the Canadian dollar at par when New Brunswick entered the Canadian Confederation.

Coins

The  and 1 cent were struck in bronze, the others in silver. The  cent piece was struck in error by the Royal Mint, as New Brunswick used a different pound conversion rate than Nova Scotia and did not require the denomination. As most of the coins were returned for melting, surviving  cent pieces are scarce.

Banknotes
Four chartered banks issued notes, the Bank of New Brunswick, the Central Bank of New Brunswick, the Commercial Bank of New Brunswick and the People's Bank of New Brunswick. Denominations issued were 1, 2, 3, 4, 5, 8, 10, 20, 50 and 100 dollars. The Commercial Bank's notes also bore the denominations in pounds and shillings. The Bank of New Brunswick and the People's Bank of New Brunswick continued to issue notes after Confederation, see Canadian chartered bank notes.

See also
 New Brunswick pound

References

External links
 Currency Reforms (1841-71)
 

 

Currencies of Canada
Modern obsolete currencies
1860 establishments in the British Empire
1867 disestablishments
19th-century economic history
Economy of New Brunswick